Lithocarpus bullatus is a tree in the beech family Fagaceae. The specific epithet  is from the Latin meaning "blistered", referring to the leaf surface.

Description
The greyish brown bark is smooth or fissured or lenticellate.

Distribution and habitat
Lithocarpus bullatus is endemic to Borneo.

References

bullatus
Endemic flora of Borneo
Trees of Borneo
Plants described in 1970
Flora of the Borneo montane rain forests